The Dornier Do 17 is a twin-engined light bomber produced by Dornier Flugzeugwerke for the German Luftwaffe during World War II. Designed in the early 1930s as a Schnellbomber ("fast bomber") intended to be fast enough to outrun opposing aircraft, the lightly built craft had a twin tail and "shoulder wing". Sometimes referred to as the Fliegender Bleistift ("flying pencil"), it was popular among its crews due to its handling, especially at low altitude, which made the Do 17 harder to hit than other German bombers.

The Do 17 made its combat debut in 1937 during the Spanish Civil War, operating in the Condor Legion in various roles. Along with the Heinkel He 111 it was the main bomber type of the German air arm in 1939–1940. The Dornier was used throughout the early war, and saw action in significant numbers in every major campaign theatre as a front line aircraft until the end of 1941, when its effectiveness and usage was curtailed as its bomb load and range were limited.

Production of the Dornier ended in mid-1940, in favour of the newer and more powerful Junkers Ju 88. The successor of the Do 17 was the much more powerful Dornier Do 217, which started to appear in strength in 1942. Some remaining Do 17s continued in various Luftwaffe roles until the end of the war, as a glider tug, research, and trainer aircraft. A considerable number were sent to other Axis nations, with few surviving the war. The last was scrapped in Finland.

Development
In 1932, the Ordnance Department (Heereswaffenamt) issued a specification for the construction of a "freight aircraft for German State Railways", and a "high speed mail plane for Lufthansa". The factory at Friedrichshafen began work on the design on 1 August 1932.

When the Nazis took power in 1933, Hermann Göring became National Commissar for aviation with former Deutsche Luft Hansa employee Erhard Milch as his deputy, soon forming the Ministry of Aviation. The Ministry of Aviation designated the new aircraft Do 17, and on 17 March 1933, just three months after taking office, Milch gave the go ahead for the building of prototypes. At the end of 1933, the Ministry of Aviation issued an order for a "high speed aircraft with double tail," and for a "freight aircraft with special equipment," in other words, a bomber. The original design (the Do 17 V1) configuration in 1932 had sported a single vertical stabilizer, and Dornier continued developing that model. The Do 17 was first demonstrated in mock-up form in April 1933. The "special equipment" was to be fitted later, to disguise its offensive role.

In April 1934, the Dornier works at Manzell began project "definition." During this month, the defensive armament was designed and the bomb release mechanism details ironed out. Production of these prototypes began on 20 May 1934 and, on 23 November 1934, the Do 17 V1, with a single fin and powered by two BMW VI 7.3 motors, took off on its first flight. Testing was delayed by a series of accidents, with V1 being damaged in landing accidents in February and April 1935. The twin-tailed V2 (powered by low-compression BMW VI 6.3 engines) first flew on 18 May 1935 and was evaluated together with the V1 by the Ministry of Aviation at Rechlin in June. During the tests, the single fin proved to be only marginally stable, resulting in the V1 being modified with a twin tail. The aircraft was destroyed in a crash after an engine failure on 21 December 1935. The V3, also fitted with a twin tail, was originally planned to be powered by Hispano-Suiza 12Ybrs engines, but as these were unavailable, it was fitted with BMW VI 7.3 engines like the V1 and flew on 19 September 1935. The V1 prototype remained the only built machine with the single stabilizer.

It is claimed that, unlike the Heinkel He 111 series, whose military use was planned from the start, the Do 17 V1 was contracted as a fast six-passenger mail plane to compete with the smaller Heinkel He 70 monoplane It has been suggested that it was rejected by Luft Hansa, as the cramped cabin was too uncomfortable for passenger use and the operating costs were too high for a mail plane. According to the story, the three prototypes remained unused in the Dornier factory in Lowental for almost six months, until Flight Captain Untucht of Luft Hansa came across them. After receiving permission to fly one of the machines, he proceeded to put it through an almost stunt flying routine. After landing, he said that "the machine is as nimble as a fighter, give it more lateral stability and we'll have a high speed bomber!" Untucht's comments prompted Dornier to redesign the tail unit and revived interest in the type.

Dornier was then ordered to produce the V4 prototype. Some sources state this differed from the V3 in that the passenger portholes were removed and the single fin was replaced with two smaller ones. Photographic evidence demonstrates the V3 had twin stabilizers from the start of its construction. The tests of the "twin-tailed" V4, V6 and V7 prototypes were positive and more prototypes like the V8 emerged as the forerunner of the long-range reconnaissance version, while the V9 was tested as a high-speed airliner. The V9 machine was still flying in 1944.

Design
The forward fuselage had a conventional stepped cockpit, with a fully glazed nose. Early variants were labelled the "flying pencil" owing to its sleek and continuous "stick-like" lines. As a result of the lessons learned in the Spanish Civil War, the cockpit roof was raised and the lower, or bottom half, of the crew compartment was a typical under-nose gondola or "Bodenlafette" (abbreviated Bola): this inverted-casemate design ventral defensive armament position was a common feature of most German medium bombers. The Bola was extended back to the leading edge of the wings where the lower-rear gunners position and upper-rear gunner position were level with each other. As with contemporary German bombers, the crew were concentrated in a single compartment. 

The cockpit layout consisted of the pilot seat and front gunner in the forward part of the cockpit. The pilot sat on the left side, close up to the Plexiglas windshield. One of the gunners sat on the right seat, which was set further back to provide room for the  MG 15 machine gun to be traversed in use. The Do 17 usually carried a crew of four: the pilot, a bombardier and two gunners. The bomb-aimer also manned the MG 15 in the nose glazing and Bola-housed rear lower position. The two gunners operated the forward-firing MG 15 installed in the front windshield, the two MGs located in the side windows (one each side) and the rearward firing weapon. The cockpit offered a bright and panoramic view at high altitude. The standard ammunition load was 3,300 rounds of 7.92 mm ammunition in 44 double-drum magazines.

The positions of the wing roots were offset. The leading edge wing root merged with the top of the fuselage and cockpit. As the wing extended backwards, by roughly two thirds, it declined downwards at a sharp angle so that the trailing edge wing root ended nearly halfway down the side of the fuselage increasing the angle of incidence. This design feature was used on all future Dornier bomber designs, namely the Dornier Do 217. The trailing edge was faired into the round fuselage shape. The engine nacelle was also faired into the flaps. The extreme rear of the nacelle was hollow and allowed the flap with an attached vertical slot to fit into the cavity when deployed.

It was thin and narrow, which presented an enemy with a difficult target to hit. The fuselage had twin vertical stabilizers to increase lateral stability. The power plant of the Z-1 was to have been the Daimler-Benz DB 601 but, owing to shortages from priority allocation for Bf 109E and Bf 110 fighter production, it was allocated Bramo 323 A-1 power plants. The introduction of the Bramo 323P increased the Z-2 performance slightly in all areas.

The Dornier had self-sealing fuel tanks to protect fuel stored in the wings and fuselage. This reduced the loss of fuel and risk of fire when hit in action, and often enabled the aircraft to return. Twenty oxygen bottles were provided for crew use during long flights above .

Communications usually consisted of FuG X, the later FuG 10, navigational direction finder PeilG V direction finder (PeilG - Peilgerät) and the FuG 25 IFF and FuBI 1 blind-landing devices. The crew communicated by EiV intercom. A primitive autopilot device, the Siemens K4Ü, was installed and could maintain bearing using the rudder's control surfaces.

The bomb bay accommodated four bomb racks, the No. 5 for SC50 bombs and two ETC 500 racks to carry heavier loads of up to  each. A Lotfe A, or B bombsight was issued together with the BZA-2 aperture (a modernised optical lens system). The aircraft's bomb bay allowed two options. With half the maximum load, ten  bombs, additional fuel tanks could be placed into the forward part of the bomb bay to increase range. The bomb aimer aimed the bombs via the Lotfe (A, B or C 7/A, depending on the variant) bomb sight which was in the left side of the nose compartment directly under and forward of the pilot.

Variants

Early Daimler-Benz-powered variants

The initial production variants were the Do 17E-1 bomber, which was tested with two Daimler-Benz DB 600, and Do 17F-1 reconnaissance aircraft, powered like the early prototypes with BMW VI engines, which entered production in late 1936. The first Luftwaffe units converted to the Do 17 in early 1937.

The Do 17E-1 was equipped with two BMW VI 7.3D inline engines of 750 PS each. The crew numbered three. The radio operator manned the two 7.92 mm MG 15 machine guns within a B-Stand pod in the rear cockpit. They had 750 rounds of ammunition. The bomb bay was divided into two compartments. A single ETC 500/IX bomb rack could be mounted externally underneath the aircraft to carry a 500 kg bomb. A Do 17 E-1 with the designation D-AJUN was tested with an unusual configuration, two SC 500 bombs mounted side by side under the fuselage. It showed a notable performance reduction due to the increase in weight and drag, this configuration was not used operationally. The E-1 continued to carry low bomb loads into the Second World War. Conducting a shallow dive the light frame of the Do 17 could reach . Several E-1s were rebuilt as E-2 or E-3, at least three E-2 and one E-3 were used by DVL and Hansa-Luftbild GmbH (Hansa Aerial Photography Ltd) in a secret military reconnaissance role prior to the war.

The Do 17F-1 was a long-range reconnaissance aircraft based on field modified Do 17Es. The Do 17 prototype V8 was used to test the configuration of the F-1 and V11 for the F-2. The defensive armament consisted of a MG 15 in the B- and C-Stand (B-Stand - an upper rear firing position, C-Stand — lower gun emplacement). The fuselage had two cameras along with six ejector tubes for flashlight cartridges. The F-1 saw service until replaced by the Do 17 P in 1938. Only one F-2 was ever built, it was designated D-ACZJ and was used by Zeiss-Jena Company as a factory aircraft.

Conversion of two E-2 series aircraft with two BMW 132F radial engines led to the Do 17 J-1 and J-2. These aircraft served as flight testing machines to evaluate the BMW 132 for usage in the Do 17. The aircraft were the V18 (Wrk Nr, or Werknummer meaning works/factory number, 2021) and V19 (Wrk Nr 2022) prototypes. Trials began in late 1937. A similar conversion, but with Bramo 323 radial engines, led to the designation Do 17 L-1 and L-2. Two Do 17 (Wrk Nr 2031 and 2032) were renamed as V20 and V21 prototypes and used to evaluate the Bramo 323 for usage in the Do 17. The test was satisfactory and all future production models were equipped with this engine.

After seeing the Do 17M V1 at the Zürich air races in 1937, the Yugoslav Royal Air Force bought license rights for production at the Drzavna Fabrika Aviona factory in 1938. They equipped it with the more powerful Gnome-Rhône 14 NO radial engine. Dornier designs were delivered to the Pomorsko Vazduhoplovstvo (Naval Aviation - PV) in 1926, namely the Dornier Komet and Dornier Do Y heavy bombers. The Yugoslavs were familiar with Dornier designs, and on 19 November 1935 Yugoslav pilots test-flew the Do 17 V-3 prototype, D-ABIH, W.Nr. 258. They decided to select the Do 17 for service, despite it being more expensive than any other aircraft, because of the German willingness to deliver them quickly without limitations on numbers.

The Do 17L-0 and Do 17M-0 were developed in parallel as replacements for the earlier E and Fs, the L being the reconnaissance version. Two L and one M versions were built as prototypes, both with another MG 15 in the nose.

At the International Military Aircraft Competition at Zürich, Switzerland in 1937, the Dornier Do 17M V1 proved a leader in its class and was faster than the fastest foreign fighter, the French Dewoitine D.510. The Do 17, along with the Messerschmitt Bf 109, won many prizes, demonstrating the prowess of German aviation design.

Radial variants
Despite its success, owing to shortages in the supply of the Daimler-Benz engine, the production Do 17M was fitted with the Bramo 323 engine, with the corresponding reconnaissance aircraft, the Do 17P, being powered by BMW 132Ns to give better range.

The supply of the DB 600 remained extremely limited as production was soon switched over to the fuel-injected DB 601, which was reserved for the Messerschmitt Bf 109 and Messerschmitt Bf 110 fighters. The resulting Do 17 M-1 was produced in small numbers and operated until 1941.

The prototypes for the M-1 series were Do 17M V1 (Werk Nr 691) and Do 17M V2 (Werk Nr 692) which were tested with bomb loads of a medium bomber. The third prototype, Do 17M V3 was evaluated as a fast bomber. The M V1 was fitted with two Daimler Benz DB 601 inline engines while the M V2 and M V3 had the Bramo 323 A and D respectively. The Ministry of Aviation favoured the widespread use of the DB 601, but demand for the DB 601s in fighter aircraft and the lack of production forced the use of the Bramo.

The Do 17 M-1 started its service as a medium bomber and was able to carry  of bombs. It was equipped with two air-cooled Bramo 323 A-1 or A-2. The defensive armament consisted of two, and later three, MG 15 machine guns. The first was operated in an A-Stand pod operated by the navigator through the windshield. The position was allocated 370 rounds of ammunition. The rearward firing B-Stand was operated by the radio operator and allocated 750 rounds. The rear position in the lower fuselage was allocated 375 rounds in a C-Stand pod. The Do 17M could carry a bomb load of either 20 SC50  or two SC250  bombs or 10 SC50 and a single SC250 bomb. The speed of the M was superior to that of the E variant.

Reconnaissance aircraft based on the M-1, the under-surfaces of the wing were covered with duralumin and it had a wider engine axis and longer engine nacelles. The demand for a reconnaissance aircraft based on the M-1 led to the development of the P-1 variant.

The L version would not be able to enter production with the DB 600 owing to its use in the Bf 109, and the Bramo engine was rather thirsty on fuel and left the M models with too short a range for reconnaissance use. BMW 132N radials of 865 PS were selected instead, which had lower fuel consumption for better range. Another two prototypes with DB 600 engines were produced as the Do 17R-0, but did not enter production. During reconnaissance missions the P-1 was armed with four MG 15s in the A, B and C—Stands. One machine gun was located in the rear of the cockpit, another in the lower rear Bola mount, one facing forward through the windscreen and the other in the nose glazing. In earlier variants the B-Stand (the gun position in the upper rear cockpit) was open to the elements, but the P-1 now provided an enclosed bulb-shaped mount protecting the radio operator from the weather.

The P variant had similar features to the Do 17M-1, with added blind flying and camera equipment for reconnaissance work. The Do 17P-1 was powered by two BMW 132N radial engines with a maximum performance of 865 PS ( each. The machine was fitted with several radio variations. The FuG IIIaU radio (Funkgerät), the PeilG V direction finder (PeilG - Peilgerät) and the FuBI 1 radio blind-landing device (FuBI - Funkblindlandegerät). The crew of three communicated with each other via the EiV intercom (EiV -Eigenverständigungsanlage). The P-1 was equipped with either Rb 20/30 and Rb 50/30 or Rb 20/18 and Rb 50/18 cameras. The P-1/trop was fitted with filters and protection for the cameras. The cameras were controlled remotely by the crew from the cockpit.

Due to a shortage of night fighters, at least one Do 17P-1 was assigned to this role. A smooth metal sheet was installed in place of its glass nose and it was armed with three  MG 151/20 cannons. The machine operated under Luftflotte 1.

The Do 17P-2 was identical to the P-1, with the additional installation of an ETC 500 bomb rack under the fuselage. These aircraft were designed for night reconnaissance. It is assumed that Dornier converted most, if not all, P-2 models from existing P-1 production aircraft.

Unlike the P-2, the Do 17R-1 did not see series production. The experiences of the Spanish Civil War proved that unarmed aircraft were easy prey for fighter aircraft. The R-1 was to be a fast long-range reconnaissance aircraft with two additional fuel cells inside the fuselage aft of the bomb bay. Two variants were suggested, the first (variant I) had a single Rb 50/30 and two Rb 20/30 cameras, while variant II had a third fuel cell to replace the rear Rb 20/30. The crew usually numbered three, but a fourth was added depending on the missions to be flown. To achieve a high performance at increased altitudes two DB 600 Gs were to be used. The power plants were tested in the Do 17R V1 prototype registered D-ABEE. The second, the R V2, registered D-ATJU, received the even more powerful DB 601 Aa engines. The power plant of the R-1s that did exist are not known.

The lessons from the Spanish Civil War had led Dornier's designers to incorporate more defensive machine guns. Battles with Soviet-built fighter aircraft had demonstrated that the Dornier was not as fast and invulnerable as was first thought. To cope with this, a completely new pod-like cockpit was designed to give the crew more room and better visibility. The roof was extended upward over the line of the fuselage, sloping down to meet it just in front of the wing. The dorsal gun was moved to the rear of the pod where it had a considerably better field of fire. Likewise, the floor was dropped under the fuselage as a Bola casemate-style defensive armament emplacement, and the ventral gun moved to the back of the Bola, allowing it to fire directly to the rear. The changes in the roof and floor made the whole front of the aircraft much larger. The rest of the airframe remained the same. The new cockpit design was nicknamed Kampfkopf (German: "battle head").

Three S variant prototypes with the DB 600 G inline engines were tested. The S-01 (designation D-AFFY), 03 and 04 were flown. The inverted V-12 engines were constructed as the Do 17 S-0 reconnaissance version, but it did not go into production. An additional 15 Do 17 U-1 pathfinder models were built, similar to the S-0 but adding another crewman (taking the total to five) to operate the extra radio equipment. The U models were to fly ahead of other bombers on night missions, using the radio equipment to locate the target and drop flares on it. They were personally requested by KG 100 as experimental models for this role. The three prototypes (U-01 - U-03) and twelve production aircraft were built by 1938.

Dornier Do 17Z: The main variant

The Dornier Do 17Z series was the most recognised and mass-produced variant, and saw more combat service than the E-U types. The type was modified as a result of combat experience during the Spanish Civil War. The forward fuselage was redesigned, with the cockpit area being "dropped", or extended further to enable a rear firing gunner position to be installed, and the canopy extended aft, until it was nearly parallel with the leading edge and wing root.

To test the design, the Do 17S and Do 17U were produced, both to be powered by the DB 600 power plants. However, a call for all DB 600 series engines to be reserved for fighters led to the variants being fitted with Bramo Fafnir 323 A radial engines. It proved to be underpowered, so Bramo 323 P engines were then fitted. Only three Do 17S and 15 Do 17Us were built. Later variants, in the Do 17 Z-3, Z-4 and Z-5, which were fitted with cameras, dual trainer controls and flotation aids (for maritime operations) respectively, still could not solve the problems with range and bomb load.

At first, a batch of Z-0s were built with the Fafnir for testing, the DB 600 again proving to be too hard to obtain. The Luftwaffe, not being satisfied with the test outcome of the Z series, immediately ordered performance and design studies to increase the overall performance of the bomber. These resulted in very optimistic speeds and altitudes for all future Z variants, especially for the Z-5 aircraft. Unfortunately, production aircraft never reached these optimistic performances during the service career of the Do 17Z. At , the heavy Do 17Z-1 used two Bramo 323 A-1 engines with self-sealing fuel cells in the fuselage and wings. The crew of four consumed approximately 20 bottles of oxygen during long flights above . The introduction of the Bramo 323P increased subsequent performance in the following sub variants.

This was addressed in the major production model, the Do 17 Z-2. However the combat range with a full  bomb load was a very short . The armament was further upgraded by adding another pair of guns firing out of the sides of the upper part of the pod, but as the three guns were all fired by a single gunner, only one of them could be fired at a time. From May 1940, 422 Do 17 Z-2s flew with Kampfgeschwader 2, Kampfgeschwader 3, Kampfgeschwader 76 and Kampfgeschwader 77. After heavy losses of Do 17s during the Battle of Britain it was decided to replace the MG FF cannon with the more powerful MG 151/15. Losses had mounted in spite of an increase of up to eight machine guns in some Dorniers.

The Z-3 formed part of the bomber versions of the Z series, it was, however, also used as a reconnaissance aircraft by the staff flight of the particular unit. The engines and the general equipment were identical to the Z-2 standard; however two cameras — the Rb 50/30 and Rb 20/30 - were incorporated into the crew entry hatch. A handheld camera was issued to the crew to validate the success during bombing missions. Autopilot equipment was added later. The Z-2 and Z-3 were identical visually, and could only be distinguished from each other by the altered crew hatch on the Z-3. Owing to spacing problems because of the added camera equipment, the ammunition supply was reduced from 44 to 42 magazines. The power plant of the Z-3 was upgraded to the Bramo 323P-2. The Bramo P-2 remained the engine of all the remaining Z series variants.

The Z-4 was designed as trainer. Although nearly identical to the Z-2 and Z-3, it featured several equipment changes optimised for blind flying training. The four-seat aircraft had a single control column with dual steering, which was achieved by a jib protruding to the right. Rudder pedals were in front of both seats. The defensive armament and bomb racks were reduced, or in most cases omitted to reduce weight.

Designed as an anti-shipping aircraft, the Z-5, was fitted with flotation cells in the fuselage and engine nacelles in case it was forced down on water. Usually the flotation devices took the form of inflatable bags stored in the rear of the engine nacelles and in bulges on either side of the nose, just behind the front glazing.

Later variants of the Z model were developed. The Z-6 was to be a reconnaissance aircraft, although it was only built as a prototype. During the war only a few were converted from existing combat variants. The type was selected for weather check flights. It was identical to the Z-1/Z-2 variants, but offensive armament was omitted and extra fuel cells fitted. This increased the fuel load to 2,890 L (578 imperial gallons). As flights required higher altitude, the oxygen supply was increased from 20 to 24 bottles. For long-range flights over water, the larger dinghy of the Z-5 with its updated emergency escape equipment was mandatory during operations. The Z-6s were also used for night fighter operations. Some of the few converted Z-6s had the Ju 88C-6 nose installed and were equipped with machine guns and cannons. The nose proved to be unsatisfactory, and it was redesigned. In the tip of the new nose was an infrared spotlight which was soon made redundant after the introduction of Lichtenstein radar which was fitted to some of the Z-6.

The Z-8 Geier was not produced. It was intended as a ground attack aircraft and reached the first planning phase but was given up due to lack of performance and protective armour allocation against anti-aircraft artillery. An increase in armour would have meant a decrease in speed which would have exposed the aircraft further to enemy fire.

The Z-9, which was fitted with special bomb release equipment, and delayed release gear for low-level attack missions. Its purpose was to suppress enemy air defences. Therefore, it was designed to fly over anti-aircraft positions and drop Butterfly Bombs, an early form of cluster bomb munitions. This could only be done with air superiority, as the Z-9 was unarmoured. The airframe and equipment was identical to the Z-1/Z-2 version. Only the bomb bay was altered to accommodate 16 bomb-dispenser systems. The design did not reach serial production.

After bomber production ended in 1940, the Z model was modified with a "solid" nose from the Ju 88C, fitted with one 20 mm MG FF cannon and three 7.92 mm (.312 in) MG 17 machine guns, to be used as night fighters. Three prototypes were converted from existing Z-series airframes to the Do 17 Z-7 Kauz I ("screech-owl") configuration. The standard Z-7 was fitted with Bramo 323P-1 radial engines and had a crew of three airmen. In comparison to the standard bomber version, the fuel load arrangement was altered by subdividing into cells. Two cells were in the wings, with a capacity of 770 litres (154 imperial gallons) each. A third cell was placed in the bomb bay within the main fuselage, having a capacity of 895 litres (179 imperial gallons). The oxygen supply for the three man crew was reduced to nine bottles, as intercepts at high altitudes were not anticipated. Add-on armour in the form of heavy steel plates was bolted to the nose bulkhead to protect the crew against frontal fire. Originally, it was planned to completely armour the crew compartment. This idea, was given up again as the increased weight would have reduced flight performance of an already slow aircraft. The ammunition loads for the three 7.92 mm MG 17s amounted to 3,000 rounds and 400 rounds of ammunition for the 20 mm MG 151 cannon (although some Do 17Z bombers carried a single 20 mm for ground attack missions).

Later, the design was further modified to the Do 17 Z-10 Kauz II, the solid nose now containing an infrared searchlight for the Spanner Anlage infrared detection system. The infrared lamp in the nose was used to illuminate the target while the display unit in the windshield made the reflection visible to the pilot. The Z-10 was armed with four 7.92 mm (.312 in) MG 17 machine guns grouped above the IR light and two 20 mm MG FF in the lower nose. The crew could reload the 20 mm cannons' drum magazines internally. The Z-10 contained an IR searchlight (Spanner-Anlage) for the Spanner infrared detection system. A single Kauz II was equipped with and tested the Lichtenstein radar.

Only 10 of these Kauz II designs were converted from existing Z-series airframes. The Spanner system proved to be essentially useless and many Z-10 were left without any detection system. At least one Z-10, coded CD+PV, was used as a flying test bed to help developing the early low-UHF band B/C version of the Lichtenstein radar system in late 1941–1942. Armament fit was similar to that of the Z-7, with an added MG 17 and an additional 1,000 rounds of ammunition in the nose section. Defensive gun positions included the B and C stand, each equipped with a single MG 15.

Production

German

Official figures state 2,139 Do 17s were built on German assembly lines. At the Dornier factory at Oberpfaffenhofen, 328 Do 17Es were built along with a further 77 Do 17Fs and 200 Do 17M variants. Do 17Z production figures for Oberpfaffenhofen stand at 420. At Friedrichshafen, 84 Do 17Ks were built, some of which were sold to the Yugoslav Royal Air Force. Do 17P production was spread out over different factory lines. At Siebel/Halle, eight were built. At the Henschel factory at Berlin-Schönefeld 73 were constructed. At the HFB plant in Hamburg 149 were built. Henschel also produced some 320 Do 17Zs, HFB contributed to construction of 74 at its Hamburg plant, and another 73 were built at Siebel. Some 105 examples of the Dornier Do 215B was later built at Oberpfaffenhofen.

By 19 September 1938, the Luftwaffe had received 579 Dornier Do 17s. These were mostly Do 17E, F, M and P variants.
During 1939–1940, some 475 Dornier Do 17Z bombers, 16 reconnaissance aircraft and nine night fighters were built. Another 100 Dornier Do 215s, an updated variant of the Do 17, were built during this period also.

Yugoslav
Other governments were interested in the Do 17. In June 1936, the Yugoslav government ordered 36 Do 17E variants from Germany. They received the last on 21 April 1939. The machines were from 72 to 96% complete.

The Dorniers were devoid of German equipment, including engines. The Yugoslavs found a French manufacturer to supply the powerplants instead. Gnome et Rhône was the supplier chosen, and the Gnome-Rhône Mistral Major engine was to be used in the Dornier. The constant-speed propellers were also poor, and delivered late. This led to trials with Piaggio Aero and Ratier propellers.
Only one of the Do 17s delivered was fitted out complete with German equipment. The rest of the Dorniers were equipped with Belgian FN 7.9 mm (.31 in) machine guns, Czech camera equipment and eventually Telefunken radio sets. Altogether, 70 Do 17s were produced by Yugoslav factories.

Operators and operational history

 The Bulgarian Air Force received 11 Do 17 Ms and Ps in 1940 and at least 11 ex-Yugoslav aircraft in 1941. Six more Do 17 Ms were delivered in 1943. They remained in service until at least 1945.

 The Air Force of the Independent State of Croatia (Zrakoplovstvo Nezavisne Države Hrvatske) received at least 21 Do 17Zs (the last 12 in 1945), 11 ex-Yugoslav Do 17Ka's in 1942 and 30 Do 17Es in 1943.

 Finnish Air Force
 46 Squadron received 15 aircraft in January 1942:

 Luftwaffe

 Royal Hungarian Air Force received one ex-Yugoslavian Do 17Ka-3.

Regia Aeronautica operated at least one ex-Yugoslavian Do 17Ka-3 under 1°Centro Sperimentale in Guidonia, where it was tested until September 1943.

 Royal Romanian Air Force received 10 worn Do 17Ms in November 1942.

Spanish Air Force received ex-Legion Condor Do 17E, F, and Ps and 13 remained in service after the end of the Spanish Civil War.

 Swiss Air Force operated a single Do 17Z-2, interned after landing at Basel Airport in April 1940.

 Royal Yugoslav Air Force

 Royal Air Force pressed into service two Yugoslav-built Do 17Ks which escaped Yugoslavia carrying King Peter and gold. The aircraft were given the serials AX706 and AX707. Both aircraft were destroyed in an air attack on Ismaïlia airfield on 27 August 1941.

 United States Army Air Forces obtained at least one Do 17E-1, WkNr 2095. Renamed Axis Sally, it was taken to the United States after the war and tested.

Surviving aircraft
Until 2007 none of the Dornier twin-engined bomber variants were thought to have survived intact, but various large relics of the Do 17 and Do 215 are held by public museums and private collectors. In September 2007 a Do 215 B-5 (variant of Do 17Z) was found largely intact in the shallow waters off Waddenzee in the Netherlands.

Dornier Do 17Z Werknummer 1160

The Dornier Do 17Z-2, Werknummer 1160, built under license by Henschel with the full Geschwaderkennung (combat wing aircraft ID code) of 5K+AR, was operated by 7 Staffel, III Gruppe, Kampfgeschwader 3 (KG 3).

On 26 August 1940, 5K+AR was taking part in a raid by KG 2 and KG 3, targeting the RAF stations RAF Debden and RAF Hornchurch. While flying over clouds, the aircraft became separated from the bomber formation and lost its bearings; it was then attacked by Boulton Paul Defiant fighters of No. 264 Squadron RAF. One of the Dornier's engines was disabled and the other damaged, so the wounded pilot, Feldwebel (Flight Sergeant) Willi Effmert, elected to make a crash landing on the Goodwin Sands. He and another crew member survived and were taken prisoner. The other two crew were killed; one is buried at Cannock Chase German war cemetery and the other in the Netherlands. The identity of the Defiant that shot down the Dornier is not certain, although it may have been one of three 264 Squadron aircraft that was shot down soon after in a battle with Messerschmitt Bf 109 fighter escorts from Jagdgeschwader 3.

 
In June 2010 diving operations were carried out and the survey report indicated that the aircraft was largely complete, although 5K+AR lay inverted on the seabed, indicating that it ground-looped on landing. The port rudder, starboard stabiliser, forward nose glazing, undercarriage doors and engine cowling were missing, but the discovery of a small debris field associated with the wreck indicates that some or all of those parts may still be present at the site. Some items, including two of the Dornier's six MG 15 machine guns, are missing and are believed to have been removed by unauthorized divers sometime after the aircraft's discovery.

On 10 June 2013, a salvage team raised the airframe from the seabed. It was then taken to the Michael Beetham Restoration Centre at the Royal Air Force Museum's Cosford site, where metallurgists from Imperial College London have a significant role in the post-recovery conservation of the aircraft.

Dornier Do 17M-1 (Hansakollen, Norway)
On 2 July 1942, a Dornier Do 17M-1 crashed in Hansakollen in Maridalen, near Oslo, Norway. The Do 17 was heading to the airport at Gardermoen, but crashed into a mountainside. All three German aviators on board were killed. They are buried in the German war cemetery at Alfaset. The wreck is well preserved and remains clearly visible, nearly 80 years after the accident.

Specifications (Do 17 Z-2)

See also

Notes

Citations

Bibliography
 Axworthy, Mark, Cornel Scafes and Cristian Craciunoiu. Third Axis, Fourth Ally: Romanian Armed Forces in the European War, 1941–1945. London: Arms and Armour Press, 1995. .
 Bergström, Christer. Barbarossa - The Air Battle: July–December 1941. London: Chevron/Ian Allan, 2007. .

 Bungay, Stephen. The Most Dangerous Enemy: A History of the Battle of Britain. London: Aurum Press, 2000.  (hardcover),  (paperback 2002).
 de Zeng, H.L., D.G. Stanket and E.J. Creek. Bomber Units of the Luftwaffe 1933-1945: A Reference Source, Volume 1. London: Ian Allan Publishing, 2007. .
 de Zeng, H.L., D.G. Stanket and E.J. Creek. Bomber Units of the Luftwaffe 1933-1945: A Reference Source, Volume 2. London: Ian Allan Publishing, 2007. .
 Ciglic, Boris and Dragan Savic. Dornier Do 17 - The Yugoslav Story: Operational Record 1937-1947. Belgrade: Jeroplan Books, 2007. .
 Dressel, Joachim and Manfred Griehl. Bombers of the Luftwaffe. London: DAG Publications, 1994. .
 Goss, Chris. Dornier 17: In Focus. Surrey, UK: Red Kite Books, 2005. .
Goss, Chris. Dornier Do 17: The 'Flying Pencil' in Luftwaffe Service: A Combat and Photographic Record. Manchester: Classic, 2020 
 Green, William. Aircraft of the Third Reich. London: Aerospace Publishing Limited, 2010, pp. 206–225. .
 Green, William. Warplanes of the Second World War, Volume Eight, Bombers and Reconnaissance Aircraft. London: MacDonald. 1967.
 Green, William and Gordon Swanborough. "The Annals of the 'Pencil': The Story of the First-Generation Dornier Do 17". Air Enthusiast, Issue 30, March—June 1986, pp. 38–53. Bromley, Kent, UK: Pilot Press. ISSN 0143-5450.
 Green, William and Gordon Swanborough. "Balkan Interlude - The Bulgarian Air Force in WWII". Air Enthusiast. Issue 39, May–August 1989. Bromley, Kent: Tri-Service Press, pp. 58–74. ISSN 0143-5450.
 Griehl, Manfred. Dornier Do 17E-Z, Do 215B; The Flying Pencil in Luftwaffe Service (World War Two Combat Aircraft Archive No. 03). Erlangen, Germany: Air Coc, 2005. .
 Hooton, E. R. Luftwaffe at War; Gathering Storm 1933-39: Volume 1. London: Chevron/Ian Allan, 2007. .
 Hooton, E. R. Luftwaffe at War; Blitzkrieg in the West: Volume 2. London: Chevron/Ian Allan, 2007. .
 Keskinen, Kalevi and Kari Stenman. Suomen Ilmavoimien historia 2: Dornier Do 17Z, Junkers Ju 88A-4. Helsinki, Finland: Hobby-Kustannus Oy, 1999. .
 Likso, Tihomir and Danko Canak. Hrvatsko Ratno Zrakoplovstvo u Drugome Svjetskom Ratu (The Croatian Air Force in the Second World War) (Croatian/English). Zagreb, Croatia: Nacionalna, 1998. .
 March, Daniel J. British Warplanes of World War II. London: Aerospace Publishing, 1998. .
 Munson, Kenneth. Fighters and Bombers of World War II. London: Peerage Books, 1983. .
 Nedyalkov, Dimitar. Air Power of the Kingdom of Bulgaria, Volume IV. Sofia: FARK OOD, 2001. .
 Neulen, Hans Werner. In the Skies of Europe: Air Forces Allied to the Luftwaffe 1939–1945. Wiltshire, UK: Crowood, 2000. .

 Nowarra, Heinz J.The Flying Pencil. Atglen, Pennsylvania: Schiffer Publishing, 1990. .
Olrog, Mikael. Dornier Do 215: From Reconnaissance Aircraft to Nightfighter. Manchester, UK: Crecy Publishing, 2017. 
 Savic, Dragan and Boris Ciglic. Croatian Aces of World War II (Osprey Aircraft of the Aces - 49). Oxford, UK: Oxford, 2002. .
 Schlaug, Georg. Die deutschen Lastensegler Verbände 1937–1945 (German Glider Units) (German). Stuttgart: Motorbuch, 1985. .
 Smith, J.R. The Do 17 and Do 215 (No. 164). London: Profile Publications, 1967.
 Smith, J.R. and Antony L. Kay. German Aircraft of the Second World War. London: Putnam, 1990. .
 Staerck, Christopher and Paul Sinnott. Luftwaffe: The Allied Intelligence Files. Washington, DC: Potomac Books, 2002. .
 Wróbel, Arkadiusz. Dornier DO 17/DO 215 (Monograph Series 39). Lublin, Poland: Kagero Oficyna Wydawnicza, 2008. .

External links

 Dornier Do 17Z-2 Werke nr. 1160 located on Goodwin Sands 
 History of Dornier Do 17Z-2 Werke nr. 1160 and the German crew
 Images and survey 
 Dornier 17 Research site

Do 017
1930s German bomber aircraft
World War II light bombers of Germany
High-wing aircraft
Aircraft first flown in 1934
Twin piston-engined tractor aircraft
Twin-tail aircraft
World War II aircraft of Finland